Alipurduar District  is the 20th district in the state of West Bengal, India. The district has its headquarters at Alipurduar. It was made a district by bifurcating Jalpaiguri district in 2014.

It consists of Alipurduar municipality, Falakata municipality and six community development blocks: Madarihat–Birpara, Alipurduar–I, Alipurduar–II, Falakata, Kalchini and Kumargram. The six blocks contain 66 gram panchayats and nine census towns.

Administration 
Apart from the Alipurduar municipality and Falakata municipality, the district contains eight census towns and rural areas of 66 gram panchayats under six community development blocks: Madarihat-Birpara, Alipurduar-I, Alipurduar–II, Kalchini, Falakata and Kumargram.
Geographically the district lies in between 26.4°N to 26.83°N and 89°E to 89.9°E.

The nine census towns are Paschim Jitpur, Chechakhata, Alipurduar Railway Junction, Bholar Dabri, Sobhaganj, Jaygaon and Uttar Latabari and Uttar Kamakhyaguri.

Railway network
Alipurduar railway division has at least 710 km of railway track. It is the largest division of the NFR zone. In Alipurduar district there are two major stations, Alipurduar junction(APDJ) and New Alipurduar (NOQ). There are other stations in the district viz. Falakata Railway Station, Kamakhyaguri Railway Station, Dalgaon Railway Station, Hasimara Railway Station, Rajabhatkhawa, Hamiltongunj etc.

Legislative segments
There are 5 assembly constituency in Alipurduar district :

As per order of the Delimitation Commission in respect of the delimitation of constituencies in the West Bengal, the area under Kumargram block and seven gram panchayats under Alipurduar–II block, viz. Bhatibari, Kohinoor, Parokata, Mahakalguri, Shamuktala, Turturi and Tatpara–I constitutes the Kumargram assembly constituency of West Bengal. The Majherdabri gram panchayat under Alipurduar–II block and the area under Kalchini block constitutes the Kalchini assembly constituency. The Alipurduar municipality, the Alipurduar Railway Junction census town, and the gram panchayats of Chaporer Par–I, Chaporer Par–II and Tatpara–II under Alipurduar–II block and ten gram panchayats of Alipurduar–I block, viz. Banchukamari, Parorpar, Shalkumar–I, Vivekananda–I, Chakowakheti, Patlakhawa, Shalkumar–II, Vivekananda–II, Mathura and Tapsikhata form the Alipurduars assembly constituency. The other gram panchayat of Alipurduar–I block, viz. Purba Kanthalbari forms the Falakata assembly constituency along with the area under Falakata block. Madarihat block is part of Madarihat assembly constituency. Kumargram, Kalchini and Madarihat constituencies is reserved for Scheduled tribes (ST) candidates. Falakata constituency is reserved for Scheduled castes (SC) candidates. All these five assembly constituencies are part of Alipurduars (Lok Sabha constituency), which is reserved for ST candidates.

Demographics 
As of the 2011 census, Alipurduar district has a population of 1,491,250, of which 1,183,704 are rural and 307,456 are urban. Scheduled Castes and Scheduled Tribes make up 456,706 (30.62%) and 382,112 (25.62%) of the population respectively.

Religion

Hindus are the majority in all blocks. Muslims are spread evenly throughout the district, but Christians, traditional religions and Buddhists are concentrated in the tea garden areas.

Language

At the time of the 2011 census, 50.28% spoke Bengali, 16.80% Sadri, 9.70% Nepali, 3.67% Hindi, 3.17% Rajbongshi, 3.13% Kurukh, 2.38% Boro, 1.39% Bhojpuri and 1.32% Santali as their first language.

Visitor attractions

 Buxa Tiger Reserve, IUCN category II national park
 Jayanti Hills
 Buxa Fort, built by British Raj
 Jaldapara National Park
 Chilapata Forests
 Jaigaon, a small town of Alipurduar district and near the Bhutan border
 Rajabhatkhawa Museum at Rajabhatkhawa
Rajabhatkhawa Forest
 Raimatang
Jayanti
 Santalabari
 Rovers point
 Roopang valley
 Lepchakha
 Chunabhati
 Chipra Forest
Chilapata Forest 
Buxa Tiger Reserve
Dima Bridge 
Vistadome Ride 
Tons of Tea Estates

Villages
 

Mejbil

Notes

References

External links

 

 
Districts of West Bengal
2014 establishments in West Bengal